Tagiades japetus, commonly known as the pied flat or the common snow flat, is a species of spread-winged skipper butterfly belonging to the family Hesperiidae. It is widely distributed, being found from India, the Himalayas, Southeast Asia, to Australia. It contains several recognized subspecies.

Description

Life cycle and ecology
The eggs are laid on the upper surface of young leaves. They hatch in about six days, whereupon they will construct a leaf shelter by cutting the edge of a leaf, folding a triangular piece back, and then attaching it with silk. During the day, they hide under this shelter and only emerge at night to feed. The larvae feed on leaves of vines belonging to the genus Dioscorea; including Dioscorea transversa, Dioscorea alata, and Dioscorea numularia. They may make other shelters as they grow larger. After about 23 days, they pupate inside their final shelter, emerging as adults after 10 days. The adults are quick flyers, maintaining a height relatively close to ground, generally under large trees, often resting under the leaves. They are usually encountered resting underneath leaf surfaces. They feed on nectar from flowers during the morning. Mating is not seasonal and adults emerge all throughout the year. However, the population is greatest during the wet season.

Distribution and habitat
Tagiades japetus have a wide range of occurrence. They are found from Sri Lanka and India to the Himalayas, and Indochina. They also occur throughout the Maritime Southeast Asia to the Philippines and down to Papua New Guinea and the surrounding islands, and northeastern Australia.

They are commonly found in the edges of rainforests, vine thickets, and sometimes in cultivated lands.

Subspecies
Tagiades japetus contains several subspecies including the ones listed below with their common names and areas of distribution:
Tagiades japetus atticus (Fabricius, 1793) - common snow flat (Madhya Pradesh to Bengal, Dehra Dun to Assam, Myanmar)
Tagiades japetus avienus Fruhstorfer, 1910 - Key Island
Tagiades japetus bandanus Fruhstorfer, 1910 - Banda Island
Tagiades japetus brasidas Doherty, 1891 - Sumba, Indonesia
Tagiades japetus engnanicus Fruhstorfer, 1910 - Enggano Island, western Sumatra
Tagiades japetus janetta Butler, 1870 - black and white flat (northern gulf and north-eastern coast of Queensland, Aru Islands, Irian Jaya, Papua New Guinea, and Solomon Islands)
Tagiades japetus japetus (Stoll, 1782) - Ambon, Maluku, Indonesia
Tagiades japetus navus (Fruhstorfer, 1910) - Sula and Tukangbesi Islands
Tagiades japetus obscurus Mabille, 1876 (Ceylon snow flat) - Sri Lanka, Nilgiris, Shevaroys, and the Palni Hills of southern India
Tagiades japetus prasnaja Fruhstorfer, 1910 - Sulawesi, Banggai, and Selayar Island
Tagiades japetus titus (Plötz, 1884) - Philippine common snow flat (endemic to the Philippines)
Tagiades japetus xarea Mabille, 1891 - Timor

References

External links

Australian Faunal Directory
Australian Insects

Tagiades
Butterflies of Singapore
Butterflies of Indochina